Stefan Michał Olszowski (born 28 August 1931) is a Polish politician, who was a member of Polish United Workers' Party. He served as the foreign minister of the People's Republic of Poland for two terms.

Biography
Olszowski was born in Torun on 28 August 1931. He was a member of the Politburo of the Polish United Workers' Party from December 1970 to his resignation on 12 November 1985. He served as the propaganda chief of the party in the late 1960s and at the beginning of the 1970s.

He was appointed foreign minister on 22 December 1971, replacing Stefan Jędrychowski in the post. He was in office until 2 December 1976 when Emil Wojtaszek replaced him in the post. In 1980, he was appointed ambassador to East Germany and left the politburo for this post that he held just six months. Then he continued to serve at the politburo. He acted as the party's central committee secretary for ideology and media from August 1980 to July 1982. Then he was secondly appointed foreign minister in July 1982, replacing Józef Czyrek in the post. Before his appointment as foreign minister he run for the presidency of the party, but he was not elected. His term as foreign minister ended on 12 November 1985. He was also dismissed from the party leadership in 1985, partly due to his relationship with a Polish journalist whom he married after divorcing his first spouse. Then he and his girlfriend settled in New York in 1986.

Views and activities
Under the Edward Gierek's rule in the party, Olszowski was a reformist. However, later he became a hard-liner politician and a supporter of the Soviet Union while he was in office. In March 1968, he was the leading orchestrator of the anti-Semitic campaign began in Poland. In November 1973, he paid an official visit to Rome that was the first official
visit to the Vatican by a Polish government minister since World War II. However, during the visit of Pope to Poland from 16 to 23 June 1983 he and Prime Minister Mieczyslaw Rakowski directly attacked on some of the Pope's pronouncements.

Olszowski together with other hard-liners strived for an armed confrontation with the Solidarity movement. He was instrumental in cracking down the movement at its initial phase.

Personal life
Olszowski married twice. Following his divorce, he married a younger Polish journalist woman. They live in New York.

References

20th-century Polish politicians
1931 births
Ambassadors of Poland to East Germany
Living people
Members of the Politburo of the Polish United Workers' Party
Members of the Polish Sejm 1969–1972
Members of the Polish Sejm 1972–1976
Members of the Polish Sejm 1976–1980
Ministers of Foreign Affairs of Poland
People from Pomeranian Voivodeship (1919–1939)
People from Toruń
People of the Cold War